This article lists those who have served as President of Murray Edwards College, Cambridge (previously known as New Hall, Cambridge) since its foundation in 1954.

Presidents of New Hall, Cambridge

 1954–1981 Dame Rosemary Murray
 1981–1995 Valerie Pearl
 1995–1996 Zara Steiner (acting)
 1996–2008 Anne Lonsdale

Dr Zara Steiner served as Acting President between the retirement of Valerie Pearl in September 1995 and the appointment of Anne Lonsdale in January 1996.

Presidents of Murray Edwards College, Cambridge

2008–2013 Jennifer Barnes
2013–present Dame Barbara Stocking

References

 History of New Hall, Cambridge

Presidents
Murray Edwards